Mienerita is a genus of medium-sized to small sea snails with a gill and an operculum, marine gastropod molluscs in the subfamily Neritinae of the family Neritidae, the nerites.

Species
 Mienerita debilis (Dufo, 1840)

References

 Eichhorst T.E. (2016). Neritidae of the world. Volume 1. Harxheim: Conchbooks. 695 pp

External links
 Dekker, H. (2000). The Neritidae from the circumarabian seas. Vita Marina. 47(2): 29-64

Neritidae